Sir Edwin Arthur Lewis Wijewardena, KC (21 March 1887 – 1964) was the 28th Chief Justice of Ceylon.

Educated at Ananda College, Colombo and S. Thomas' College, Mount Lavinia, Wijewardena graduated from University of Cambridge and qualified as a barrister. On his return to Ceylon he became an advocate. He took the entrance exam for the Ceylon Civil Service and passed, but was not admitted to failing the medical exam. He served as the solicitor general of Ceylon from 1936 to 1938 and was appointed King's Counsel. Appointed to the Supreme Court, Wijewardena was appointed Chief Justice in 1949 succeeding the acting Francis Soertsz and was Chief Justice until 1950. He was succeeded by Edward Jayetileke. He was knighted as a Knights Bachelor in the 1949 Birthday Honours.

References

1887 births
1964 deaths
Governors-general of Ceylon
Chief justices of Sri Lanka
Puisne Justices of the Supreme Court of Ceylon
W
Sinhalese judges
20th-century Sri Lankan people
19th-century Sri Lankan people
Alumni of Ananda College
Alumni of the University of Cambridge
Alumni of S. Thomas' College, Mount Lavinia
Sinhalese civil servants
Ceylonese Knights Bachelor
Ceylonese Queen's Counsel
Ceylonese advocates